The Siamese pied myna (Gracupica floweri) is a species of starling in the family Sturnidae. Its plumage is black and white, with a black collar. It is found in Myanmar and China to Thailand, Laos, and Cambodia. It previously was considered a subspecies of the pied myna, which has now been split into three species. It can be distinguished from the Indian pied myna (G. contra) and Javan pied myna (G. jalla) by more extensive white streaking on its forehead from both and a wider extent of bare red-orange facial skin around the eye compared to G. contra, but much less compared to G. jalla.

References

Siamese pied myna
Siamese pied myna
Birds of South China
Birds of Southeast Asia
Siamese pied myna
Siamese pied myna